Trichillinus is a genus of ground beetles in the family Carabidae. There are more than 20 described species in Trichillinus, found in Africa.

Species
These 22 species belong to the genus Trichillinus:

 Trichillinus abacetoides (Alluaud, 1936)  (Madagascar)
 Trichillinus basilewskyi (Straneo, 1949)  (Sub-Saharan Africa)
 Trichillinus capitatus (Straneo, 1949)  (Sub-Saharan Africa)
 Trichillinus congoensis (Straneo, 1949)  (Sub-Saharan Africa)
 Trichillinus dactyleuryoides (Alluaud, 1936)  (Madagascar)
 Trichillinus dirotoides (Alluaud, 1936)  (Cameroon)
 Trichillinus guineensis (Alluaud, 1936)  (Sub-Saharan Africa)
 Trichillinus lamottei (Straneo, 1949)  (Sub-Saharan Africa)
 Trichillinus leleupi (Straneo, 1950)  (Sub-Saharan Africa)
 Trichillinus linearis (Straneo, 1949)  (Sub-Saharan Africa)
 Trichillinus mirei (Straneo, 1980)  (Cameroon)
 Trichillinus obesus (Alluaud, 1936)  (Sub-Saharan Africa)
 Trichillinus perrieri (Jeannel, 1948)  (Madagascar)
 Trichillinus ranomafanae Kavanaugh & Rainio, 2016  (Madagascar)
 Trichillinus robustus (Straneo, 1949)  (Sub-Saharan Africa)
 Trichillinus schoutedeni (Straneo, 1949)  (Sub-Saharan Africa)
 Trichillinus semlikianus (Alluaud, 1936)  (Sub-Saharan Africa)
 Trichillinus sicardi (Jeannel, 1948)  (Madagascar)
 Trichillinus strangulatus (Alluaud, 1936)  (Cameroon)
 Trichillinus subcongoensis (Straneo, 1951)  (Sub-Saharan Africa)
 Trichillinus sublaevis (Straneo, 1949)  (Sub-Saharan Africa)
 Trichillinus terricola (Straneo, 1951)  (Sub-Saharan Africa)

References

Pterostichinae